Zachary "Zach" McKenzie Stone (born 6 September 1991 in Collingwood, Ontario) is a Canadian professional snowboarder and World Championship medalist. Stone won a silver medal at the 2011 FIS World Championships.

Biography

Snowboard World Cup results

World Championships

References

External links
FIS bio

1991 births
Living people
Sportspeople from Collingwood, Ontario
Canadian male snowboarders
Sportspeople from Ontario